This is a list of administrators and deputy governors of Kano state.
Kano State was formed in 1967-05-27 when the Northern region was split into Benue-Plateau, Kano, Kwara, North-Central, North-Eastern and North-Western states.

See also
States of Nigeria

References

Lists of state governors of Nigeria